Little Lili is a 2003 French drama film by French director Claude Miller. The film stars Ludivine Sagnier, Bernard Giraudeau, Nicole Garcia, Julie Depardieu and Jean-Pierre Marielle.

Plot
The plot is based on the 1896 stage play The Seagull by Anton Chekhov.

A group of cinematics spend a holiday in the French countryside. The film provides insight into their relationships, including that between a young man, Julien, and a local girl, Lili. Lili uses the opportunity to work her way into the cinematic world. She transfers her attentions from Julien to his mother's lover, an established filmmaker, who takes Lili on a trip to Paris.

A few years later Julien has become a filmmaker himself. His first film is inspired by the holiday with Lili. Lili, who is by now an established actress, learns about it and works herself into its cast, becoming the star of the production. However she does not resume her personal relationship with Julien, who remains faithful to his wife and young daughter.

Cast
 Nicole Garcia - Mado Marceaux
 Bernard Giraudeau - Brice
 Jean-Pierre Marielle - Simon Marceaux
 Ludivine Sagnier - Lili
 Robinson Stévenin - Julien Marceaux
 Julie Depardieu - Jeanne-Marie
 Yves Jacques - Serge
 Anne Le Ny - Léone
 Marc Betton - Guy
 Michel Piccoli - Actor Who Plays Simon
 Maylie Del Piero
 Mathieu Grondin - Julien-Acteur
 Louise Boisvert - Actress Who Plays Léone

Awards and nominations
Cannes Film Festival (France)
Nominated: Golden Palm (Claude Miller)
Chicago Film Festival (USA)
Won: Silver Hugo - Best Female Performance (Ludivine Sagnier)
César Awards (France)
Won: Best Actress – Supporting Role (Julie Depardieu)
Won: Most Promising Actress (Julie Depardieu)
Nominated: Best Actor – Supporting Role (Jean-Pierre Marielle)
Nominated: Best Director (Claude Miller)

References

External links

2003 films
2000s French-language films
2003 drama films
Films directed by Claude Miller
French drama films
2000s French films